Schloßplatz or Schlossplatz is a German language word meaning "Palace Square" or "Castle Square". It may refer to:

 Schloßplatz (Berlin)
 Schloßplatz (Dresden)
 Schlossplatz (Oldenburg)
 Schlossplatz (Stuttgart)
 Schloßplatz (Wiesbaden)

See also
 Palace Square
 Castle Square (disambiguation)